Manisch refers either to a dialect of Rotwelsch (especially in the vicinity of greater Gießen, Germany) or a speaker thereof (plural: Manische or Manen).  The term Manisch however, is also understood primarily throughout much of the German state of Hesse and parts of the Rhineland-Palatinate to refer to the Manisch/Jenisch (alternatively "gypsy") elements of their vernacular.  Several words are recognisably derived from Yiddish (e.g. malocho, "work") or Romany (e.g. pani, "water").

Manisch in Gießen

Select glossary of the Gießen Manisch dialect

See also 
 Lotegorisch
 Manush
 Rotwelsch

References

 Lerch, Hans-Günter: Tschü lowi....Das Manische in Gießen. Mit Lexikon Manisch-Deutsch und Deutsch-Manisch, 1976/2005, Reprint Edition,

External links
http://gummi-insel.de/10.html (in German)
http://www.levanzo.de/faq.php?title=Diskussion:Manische_Sprache (in German)

Cant languages
Languages of Germany
Giessen
Middle Hesse